The Ireland women's national rugby sevens team participates in international competitions such as the World Rugby Women's Sevens Series, the Rugby World Cup Sevens, the Rugby Europe Women's Sevens and Rugby sevens at the Summer Olympics. Unlike the Ireland women's national rugby union team, the sevens team is a professional team with players contracted to the Irish Rugby Football Union.

World Rugby Women's Sevens Series
Ireland first competed in the World Rugby Women's Sevens Series as an invited team in 2012–13. They entered the 2013 China Women's Sevens and won the Plate competition. After finishing as quarter-finalists in the 2013 Rugby World Cup Sevens, Ireland qualified to be a core team for 2013–14. Ireland did not participate in 2014–15 but returned as a core team in 2015–16 after finishing as runners up to Japan in a qualifying tournament hosted at UCD Bowl in August 2015. Ireland remained as a core team for 2016–17 and 2017–18. Ireland have never won a Cup at any of the Series tournaments but they have won Challenge Trophies, Plates and Bowls. Ireland's best performance in the Series came in 2016–17 when they finished ninth overall and gained their first ever wins against Fiji, England and France. In April 2017 Sene Naoupu scored three tries as Ireland won the Challenge Trophy at the 2017 Japan Women's Sevens, defeating Spain 26–7 in the final. In 2016 and 2017 they also won two successive Challenge Trophies at the Dubai Women's Sevens.

Season by season

Tournaments

Rugby World Cup Sevens
Ireland made their Rugby World Cup Sevens debut at the 2013 tournament. They qualified after finishing sixth in the 2012 Sevens Women Grand Prix Series. The team was captained by Claire Molloy and they reached the quarter-finals, finishing seventh overall.

The Ireland women's sevens team and the Ireland women's national rugby union team has often used the same set of players. For example, the 2018 Women's Six Nations Championship squad included nine rugby sevens internationals. This has occasionally led to conflicts of interest. In February 2017 Sene Naoupu, Alison Miller and Hannah Tyrrell were controversially withdrawn from Ireland's 2017 Women's Six Nations Championship squad in order to represent the Ireland Sevens in the 2017 USA Women's Sevens. The reasoning behind this decision was that the Ireland Sevens were chasing a top eight finish in the 2016–17 World Rugby Women's Sevens Series in order to qualify for the 2018 Rugby World Cup Sevens. Ireland eventually finished ninth in the Series but subsequently qualified for the World Cup after finishing third in the 2017 Rugby Europe Women's Sevens Grand Prix Series.

Rugby Europe Women's Sevens
Ireland first competed in the Rugby Europe Women's Sevens in 2006. Their best performances in the tournament were in 2016 and 2017 when they finished third on both occasions.

Olympics
In their attempt to qualify for the 2016 Summer Olympics, Ireland competed in a series of qualifying tournaments including the 2015 Rugby Europe Women's Sevens Championships, the 2015 Rugby Europe Women's Sevens Olympic Repechage Tournament and the 2016 Rugby World Women's Sevens Olympic Repechage Tournament. However they were unsuccessful in their bid to qualify.

Players

Current squad
Squad named for the 2023 World Rugby HSBC Sevens Series in Vancouver from the 3–5 March.

Caps updated to the latest date: 5 March 2023

2018 Rugby World Cup Sevens squad

Head coach:  Anthony Eddy

Honours
Challenge Trophies
Japan Women's Sevens Challenge Trophy
Winners: 2017
Dubai Women's Sevens Challenge Trophy
Winners: 2016, 2017
Plates
Rugby Europe Women's Sevens Championships Plate
Winners: 2013 , 2015 
China Women's Sevens Plate
Winners: 2013
London Women's Sevens Plate
Winners: 2013
Amsterdam Women's Sevens Plate
Winners: 2012
Bowls
China Women's Sevens Bowl
Winners: 2014
USA Women's Sevens Bowl
Winners: 2016
Hong Kong Women's Sevens Bowl
Winners: 2013

Notes

See also
 Ireland national rugby sevens team (men)

References

 
Women's national rugby sevens teams
women
World Rugby Women's Sevens Series core teams